These are the Oricon number one albums of 2001, per the Oricon Albums Chart.

Chart history

Trivia
Number-one album of 2001: Distance by Hikaru Utada.
Most weeks at number-one: Aiko, Ayumi Hamasaki, Do As Infinity, Hikaru Utada, Love Psychedelico, Mariya Takeuchi, Misia, Mr. Children, The Gospellers,  V6, Yumi Matsutoya with a total of 2 weeks.

External links
https://web.archive.org/web/20141021000023/http://www.geocities.jp/object_ori/indexa.html

See also
2001 in music

2001 record charts
Lists of number-one albums in Japan
2001 in Japanese music